Série 9020 was a class of metre-gauge diesel locomotives built by Alsthom for the Portuguese Railways (CP). They entered service in 1976. By the early years of the 21st century the metre-gauge lines on which they operated (such as the Corgo line and the Tua line) have now almost all been closed, resulting in the withdrawal of the locomotives. Some have been sold to Madarail in Madagascar.

See also

Narrow gauge railways in Portugal

Diesel locomotives of Portugal
Narrow gauge railways in Portugal
Railway locomotives introduced in 1976
Alstom locomotives